This list contains about half of the cultural property of national significance (class A) in the canton of Bern from the 2009 Swiss Inventory of Cultural Property of National and Regional Significance. It is sorted by municipality and contains 345 individual buildings, 43 collections, 30 archaeological finds and 4 other, special sites or objects.

The geographic coordinates provided are in the Swiss coordinate system as given in the Inventory.

: Top - A through M N O P R S T U V W Z

Nidau

Nods

Oberbalm

Oberbipp

Oberburg

Oberdiessbach

Oberhofen

Oberried

Oberwil bei Büren

Oberwil im Simmental

Ochlenberg

Orpund

Orvin

Péry-La Heutte

Petit-Val

Pieterlen

Plateau de Diesse

Pohlern

Rapperswil

Reconvilier

Reichenbach im Kandertal

Renan

Riggisberg

Ringgenberg

Rohrbach

Röthenbach im Emmental

Rubigen

Rüderswil

Rüeggisberg

Rüegsau

Rumendingen

Rüti bei Büren

Saanen

Saicourt

Saint-Imier

Sauge

Schangnau

Schüpfen

Schwarzenburg

Seeberg

Signau

Sigriswil

Siselen

Sonvilier

Spiez

Steffisburg

Studen

Sumiswald

Sutz-Lattrigen

Tavannes

Thun

Thunstetten

Toffen

Trachselwald

Tramelan

Trub

Tschugg

Twann-Tüscherz

Unterseen

Utzenstorf

Vechigen

Vinelz

Walperswil

Wangen an der Aare

Wiedlisbach

Wiggiswil

Wilderswil

Wileroltigen

Willadingen

Wimmis

Wohlen bei Bern

Worb

Wynau

Wynigen

Zollikofen

Zweisimmen

References
 All entries, addresses and coordinates are from:

External links
 Swiss Inventory of Cultural Property of National and Regional Significance, 2009 edition:
PDF documents: Class B objects
Geographic information system

.02
Canton of Bern
Cultural03
Cultural03
Cultural03
Cultural03